The Gospel Collection is the 58th studio album by American country music singer George Jones, released on April 4, 2003 on the Bandit Records label.

Background
Jones's fondness for gospel music is well documented.  The singer revealed to Jessica Walden of The 11th Hour magazine that his first musical memory was singing in church with his mother Clara and, in the 1989 documentary Same Ole Me, he recalls that he learned how to play the guitar at the church where his mother, a devout woman, played piano. The church was run by Brother Burl Stephens (with whom Jones would credit as co-writer of several songs on his 1959 gospel album Country Church Time) and Sister Annie, who George remembered "taught me my first chords on the guitar, like C, G, and D and things like that, and I started hangin' out over there more often. She'd get her guitar and we'd pick and sing together...We used to do all the really old gospel songs."  Jones love of gospel music actually predated his exposure to country music, which he would not hear until his family acquired their first radio. Jones had also recorded a gospel album with his then-wife Tammy Wynette in 1972 called We Love To Sing About Jesus on Epic Records, which had been produced by Billy Sherrill.  For nearly two decades, Jones and Sherrill would form one of the most successful artist/producer relationships in country music history, which included the recording of "He Stopped Loving Her Today", until Jones left Sony Music for MCA Nashville in 1991.  Sherrill had actually been retired for years near the end of their run, producing only Jones.  He came out of retirement to produce The Gospel Collection.  Jones decision to record the album is said to have been informed by his near-fatal crash in 1999, when he ran his SUV off the road while driving drunk.  The crash was a significant turning point, as he explained to Billboard in 2006: "...when I had that wreck I made up my mind, it put the fear of God in me. No more smoking, no more drinking."

Reception
Jones's 58th album peaked at number 19 on the Billboard country albums chart and number 3 on the Billboard Christian albums chart.  It received positive reviews but it was also the first album that  - after fifty years of singing, forty years of drinking, and literally thousands of shows - reveals cracks in the singer's legendary, mercurial voice.  Thom Jurek of AllMusic notes: "There is no doubt he is still a great singer, but his ability to throw his voice around and hit the higher notes in his baritone register is all but gone.  With his more limited stylistic vernacular, however, Jones digs deep and gets the tunes across, making them swing and sway with emotion and honky tonk swagger."  John Morthland of Amazon.com compliments Sherrill's production, writing that "Circuit-preacher’s son Billy Sherrill, who guided Jones’s 1970s commercial ascension, came out of retirement to produce these 24 songs (on two discs) and, especially for a guy accused back then of gussying up country too much, he forges an austere sound."

Track listing

External links
George Jones' Official Website
Record Label

2003 albums
George Jones albums
Albums produced by Billy Sherrill
Southern gospel albums